Tylopilus griseocarneus is a fungus of the family Boletaceae. Described as new to science in 1989, it is found in the coastal plains of southern New Jersey and southern Louisiana in the United States, where it grows in sandy soil under oak and pine trees.

See also
List of North American boletes

References

External links
 

griseocarneus
Fungi described in 1989
Fungi of the United States
Fungi without expected TNC conservation status